Kiran Prabhu Navgire (born 18 September 1994 at Solapur, Maharashtra) is an Indian cricketer. She currently plays for India women and Nagaland women. She set the record for the highest individual score in Women's Senior T20 Trophy, while scoring an unbeaten 162 for Nagaland against Arunachal Pradesh in 2022. She is the only Indian (male or female) to score over 150 in a T20 match.

Kiran Navgire's father is a farmer while her mother is a homemaker. She has two brothers. She had initially been into athletics, before pursuing a career as a cricketer. She first played cricket during her graduation days at the Savitribai Phule Pune University. She represented the university cricket team from 2013–14 to 2015–16 seasons without any formal training. She had also represented Pune University in the athletic events of javelin throw, shot put and 100 meters. She received her first formal training at the Azam Campus in Pune, where she took up a two-year course in physical education.

She began her domestic career with Maharashtra in the 2018–19 Senior Women's One Day League. She later decided to play for Nagaland as a guest player in the 2021-22 Women's Senior T20 Trophy as she could not get enough chances in Maharashtra team. While playing for Nagaland, she smashed 162 off 76 balls against Arunachal Pradesh at Barsapara Stadium, Guwahati on 15 April 2022, becoming the first Indian man or woman to score 150+ runs in a Twenty20 innings.

She was picked in the Velocity squad ahead of the 2022 Women's T20 Challenge. On her debut against Trailblazers on 26 May 2022, she scored a 24-ball fifty, which is the fastest fifty in the Women's T20 Challenge. Two days later, she scored a 13-ball duck in the final. Later, she was also picked for Indian women's team for T20 international series against England in September 2022.She completed her education in Baramati Sharda vidyalaya.she is inspired by movie Bhag Milkha Bhag and run around college completed 40rounds.

References

External links
 
 

1995 births
Living people
India women Twenty20 International cricketers
Cricketers from Maharashtra
Maharashtra women cricketers
Nagaland women cricketers
UP Warriorz cricketers